Sanin may refer to:

 Alexander Sanin (1869–1956), stage name of Alexander Akimovich Shoenberg, Russian actor and director
 Vladimir Sanin (1928–1989), Russian traveler and writer
 Joseph Volotsky (secular name Ivan Sanin; 1439 or 1440–1515), Russian theologian and saint
 Sanin (novel), novel by the Russian writer Mikhail Artsybashev
 San'in region in Japan

See also
 Shanin (disambiguation)